Avery House, in Griswold, Connecticut, also known as Hopeville Pond Park House, was built around 1770. The central chimney is on a stone base and has a built-in root cellar. Alterations in the house changed the traditional five-room first floor plan by eliminating the keeping rooms and the removal of the kitchen fireplace. It retains much of its original door frames and wrought-iron latch hardware. After the rehabilitation of the property, the Avery House became the Hopeville Park manager's residence and is a part of the Hopeville Pond State Park. It was listed on the National Register of Historic Places in 1986.

Construction 
The architect and the date of construction is unknown. The National Register of Historic Places nomination dates it to circa 1770 is substantiated by the construction and interior woodwork of the house. The central chimney is on a stone base and has a built-in root cellar. At the time of its nomination, the house was using asphalt shingles on its roof. The house is historically significant for its bolection molding and around fireplaces and shallow molded shelves above the fireplaces in the front chambers. Fireplace in the east room has a large single over-mantel panel and the west fireplace has two panels. Mary McMahon, who prepared the inventory form for the National Register of Historic Places, writes "A handsome corner cabinet with butterfly shelves is also located in the east room". The second floor retains its original flooring and mantels, and the post and beam construction is visible throughout the interior of the house.

Alterations in the house changed the traditional five-room first floor plan by eliminating the keeping rooms and the removal of the kitchen fireplace. Despite this, the house's original door frames and much of the doors with wrought-iron latch hardware remained by the time of its nomination in 1985. In 1935, the Civilian Conservation Corps (CCC) rehabilitated the property for park use. The house was acquired by the State of Connecticut in 1938. The CCC shingled the exterior of the house, but it is uncertain if the "inappropriate porch" was an addition they made. The CCC is also believed to be the builders of the garage/workshop.

Owners 
The owners of the house are also unknown, but two records do exist. The 1854 Baker map of New London, listed owner of the house was Captain J. Avery. An 1868 map lists a H. Bennett in residence. After the rehabilitation of the property, the Avery House became the Hopeville Park manager's residence.

Importance 
The Avery House was listed on the National Register of Historic Places in 1986. According to the nomination form and the multiple property submission sheet, the house is historically significant as an example of a well-preserved house that does not have its historical integrity degraded by alterations. McMahon writes that "[t]he interior paneling is the finest in any 18th-century house owned by DEP (Connecticut Department of Environmental Protection)." Originally, the house was set to have the surrounding  as part of its designation, but this was later changed to  because it would not impact the historic setting.

See also
National Register of Historic Places listings in New London County, Connecticut

References

Houses on the National Register of Historic Places in Connecticut
Houses completed in 1770
Houses in Griswold, Connecticut
National Register of Historic Places in New London County, Connecticut
1770 establishments in Connecticut